Marinomonas communis is a Gram-negative and aerobic bacterium from the genus of Marinomonas which has been isolated from surface seawater from Hawaii.

References

Oceanospirillales
Bacteria described in 1972